Gordon Cross (4 December 1886 – 1 June 1961) was a South African cricketer. He played in thirteen first-class matches for Border from 1903/04 and 1922/23.

See also
 List of Border representative cricketers

References

External links
 

1886 births
1961 deaths
South African cricketers
Border cricketers
Sportspeople from Qonce